Adamishin (masculine) or Adamishina (feminine) is a Slavic surname derived from the given name Adam.

People with the last name
Anatoly Adamishin (born 1934), Russian diplomat, politician, and businessman
Viktor Adamishin (1962–1995), Russian militia captain and Hero of the Russian Federation



Russian-language surnames